Hautefort is a commune in the Dordogne department in Nouvelle-Aquitaine in southwestern France.

It was part of the former province of Périgord.

History
The ancient fortress dates back to the early Middle Ages, as proved by the first document quoting its existence as early as 987. A house of Gouffier de Lastours, who won fame during the First Crusade, the castle then became the seigneurial home of the troubadour Bertran de Born, who was viscount of Hautefort.

Population

Sights
Château de Hautefort, 17th century

See also
Les Charreaux, a village depending onthe commune of Hautefort.
Communes of the Dordogne department

References

External links

 Best of Perigord

Communes of Dordogne